Hikae Rock is a rock exposure of  along the ice coast of Antarctica, lying 1 nautical mile east of Rakuda Glacier in Queen Maud Land. It was mapped from air photos and surveys by the Japanese Antarctic Research Expedition, 1957–62, and named Hikae-iwa.

References

Rock formations of Queen Maud Land
Prince Olav Coast